Stephen Kinneavy (born 23 November 1954) is an Irish former Gaelic footballer who played as a full-back at senior level for the Galway county team.

Honours
Galway
 Connacht Senior Football Championship (3): 1982, 1983, 1984

References

1954 births
Living people
All Stars Awards winners (football)
Clonbur Gaelic footballers
Gaelic football backs
Galway inter-county Gaelic footballers
Sarsfields (Kildare) Gaelic footballers